The 1949–50 NBA season was the only season for the original Denver Nuggets in the National Basketball Association.

Roster
{| class="toccolours" style="font-size: 95%; width: 100%;"
|-
! colspan="2" style="background-color: #003399;  color: #FFFFFF; text-align: center;" | Denver Nuggets 1949–50 roster
|- style="background-color: #FFCC33; color: #003399;   text-align: center;"
! Players !! Coaches
|- 
| valign="top" |
{| class="sortable" style="background:transparent; margin:0px; width:100%;"|}
! Pos. !! # !! Nat. !! Name !! Ht. !! Wt. !! From
|-

Regular season

Season standings

Record vs. opponents

Game log

References

Denver Nuggets (1948–1950)
Denver